Vacerra bonfilius is a butterfly in the family Hesperiidae. It is found in Panama, Brazil, Bolivia and Venezuela.

Subspecies
Vacerra bonfilius bonfilius (Brazil)
Vacerra bonfilius aeas (Plötz, 1882) (Panama)
Vacerra bonfilius bonta Evans, 1955 (Bolivia)
Vacerra bonfilius litana (Hewitson, 1866) (Venezuela)

References

Butterflies described in 1824
Hesperiini